Maria Arrua (born 3 March 1999) is a Paraguayan swimmer. She competed in the women's 50 metre backstroke at the 2019 World Aquatics Championships.

References

1999 births
Living people
Paraguayan female swimmers
Place of birth missing (living people)
Female backstroke swimmers